Elderson Uwa Echiéjilé (born 20 January 1988) is a Nigerian former professional footballer who played as a left-back.

He began his career at Bendel Insurance and moved to Europe in 2007, joining Rennes where he was mainly a reserve. He spent four seasons in Portugal's Primeira Liga with Braga before returning to the French Ligue 1 in 2014 to join Monaco, being loaned several times until his release four years later.

A full international for Nigeria since 2009, Echiéjilé played in two Africa Cup of Nations tournaments, winning the 2013 edition. He was also part of the squads at two World Cups.

Club career

Rennes
Born in Benin City, Echiéjilé began his senior career at Bendel Insurance FC. In August 2007 he was sold to Stade Rennais F.C. in France, playing his first Ligue 1 game on 23 December in a 0–0 draw at Toulouse FC.

During his spell with the club, however, he appeared mostly for the reserve team.

Braga
On 16 June 2010, Echiéjilé signed for S.C. Braga from Portugal for €2.5 million, on a four-year contract. He scored on his official debut for the club, netting from a corner kick in a 3–0 home win against Celtic in the qualifying rounds of the UEFA Champions League (4–2 on aggregate).

Echiéjilé played his first game in the Primeira Liga on 13 August 2010, featuring the full 90 minutes in a 3–1 home victory over Portimonense SC. He was an unused substitute in the 2011 UEFA Europa League Final, lost 1–0 to compatriots FC Porto at the Aviva Stadium in Dublin. Additionally, he scored four league goals in 26 matches in his second year, helping the Minho side finish third.

Monaco
On 17 January 2014, Echiéjilé returned to the French top flight after penning a four-and-a-half-year deal with AS Monaco FC. He scored his first goal for the team on 31 October, opening a 1–1 home draw with Stade de Reims.

On 31 August 2016, Echiéjilé moved to Belgian club Standard Liège on a season-long loan. Late into the following transfer window, he left for Spain with Sporting de Gijón also in a temporary deal.

Echiejilé continued to serve loans until his departure, representing Sivasspor and Cercle Brugge K.S.V. in the process.

HJK
In March 2019, Echiejilé signed with Helsingin Jalkapalloklubi of the Finnish Veikkausliiga. On 28 June, both parties agreed to terminate the contract by mutual consent.

International career
Echiéjilé was a member of the Nigerian under-20 team at the 2007 FIFA World Cup in Canada, playing five matches and scoring once for the quarter-finalists. Having made his debut for the senior side in 2009, he was picked for the following year's FIFA World Cup in South Africa, appearing twice in an eventual group stage exit.

Echiéjilé was called up to Nigeria's 23-man squad for the 2013 Africa Cup of Nations, scoring the first in a 4–1 semi-final defeat of Mali as the nation went on to win the tournament. Also that year he was selected for the FIFA Confederations Cup in Brazil, scoring in the opener against Tahiti.

Echiéjilé was included in Stephen Keshi's list for the 2014 World Cup, but sustained an injury in a warm-up game against Greece and was replaced by Ejike Uzoenyi. In June 2018, he was named in the 23-man squad for the upcoming edition of the FIFA World Cup in Russia, but was left out of the 2019 Africa Cup of Nations.

Career statistics

International

Honours
Braga
Taça da Liga: 2012–13

Nigeria
Africa Cup of Nations: 2013

References

External links

1988 births
Living people
Sportspeople from Benin City
Nigerian footballers
Association football defenders
Nigeria Professional Football League players
Bendel Insurance F.C. players
Ligue 1 players
Stade Rennais F.C. players
AS Monaco FC players
Primeira Liga players
Liga Portugal 2 players
S.C. Braga players
S.C. Braga B players
Belgian Pro League players
Challenger Pro League players
Standard Liège players
Cercle Brugge K.S.V. players
La Liga players
Sporting de Gijón players
Süper Lig players
Sivasspor footballers
Veikkausliiga players
Helsingin Jalkapalloklubi players
Nigeria under-20 international footballers
Nigeria international footballers
2010 FIFA World Cup players
2010 Africa Cup of Nations players
2013 Africa Cup of Nations players
2013 FIFA Confederations Cup players
2018 FIFA World Cup players
Africa Cup of Nations-winning players
Nigerian expatriate footballers
Expatriate footballers in France
Expatriate footballers in Portugal
Expatriate footballers in Monaco
Expatriate footballers in Belgium
Expatriate footballers in Spain
Expatriate footballers in Turkey
Expatriate footballers in Finland
Nigerian expatriate sportspeople in France
Nigerian expatriate sportspeople in Portugal
Nigerian expatriate sportspeople in Monaco
Nigerian expatriate sportspeople in Belgium
Nigerian expatriate sportspeople in Spain
Nigerian expatriate sportspeople in Turkey
Nigerian expatriate sportspeople in Finland